Vexilla is a genus of sea snails, marine gastropod mollusks in the family Muricidae, the murex snails or rock snails.

Species
Species within the genus Vexilla include:

Vexilla taeniata (Powis, 1835)
Vexilla variabilis (Deshayes, 1863)
Vexilla vexillum (Gmelin, 1791)

References

External links